The SoCal Olympians and Paralympians, is the largest and the oldest organization of the United States Olympic team in the United States, with a current membership of approximately 800 athletes.
Since 1912, this chapter has continually supplied the largest percentage of athletes that comprise the United States at the Olympics.

The organization dates back to 1919, and was formerly titled the Southern California Olympian chapter.
The membership area includes areas in Southern California from Fresno, California, to the Southern California border with Mexico, a distance of over 300 miles.

The current chapter was founded on March 19, 1949, with its first president, Fred Kelly of Orange, California. Since that time the SoCal Olympians and Paralympians has sought to perpetuate Southern California's outstanding Olympic heritage which dates back to 1904.

The SoCal Olympians & Paralympians help fund the dreams of future USA Olympians, Paralympians, coordinate member appearances at youth, community and corporate events, offer fellowship to members of past and current Olympic teams, and support the creation of an active, visible worldwide Olympian organization.

More than 800 USA Olympians and Paralympians from past and present United States Olympic Teams who live and work in Southern California draw upon their athletic experiences to inspire and pass on the Olympic ideals of the Olympic Charter to its communities and to enrich the lives of the youth of Southern California.

The organization stages a Welcome Home Dinner for Olympians after each summer Olympic Games, and provides sports motivational speakers to local community groups.  They participate in celebrity Golf tournaments and provide grants to Olympic and Paralympic hopefuls through their 501C3 charity, the Koroibos Foundation.

The SoCal Olympicians support the international Olympic Day by hosting sports clinics during the month of June.

The current president is Tamara Christopherson, who represented Team USA in the Sydney 2000 Olympic Games.

See also

Olympians for Olympians Fund
Paralympian
Sportsperson
United States Olympic Committee
World Olympians Association
Olympic Day Run

References

External links
Official website
Database Olympics

United States at the Olympics
June events
Southern California